David John Bleisath (born September 22, 1979) is a former American football offensive and defensive lineman for the Chicago Rush and Tampa Bay Storm of the Arena Football League.  He attended Tennessee Tech University. He graduated from Sequoyah High School in Canton, Georgia. After going undrafted in the 2003 NFL Draft, Bleisath signed with the Oakland Raiders of the National Football League (NFL) as an undrafted free agent but was released before the regular season. In 2022 he was named to the Tennessee Tech All-100th Anniversary  Football Team.

External links
Just Sports Stats
AFL stats

1979 births
Living people
People from Canton, Georgia
People from Euclid, Ohio
Sportspeople from the Atlanta metropolitan area
Players of American football from Georgia (U.S. state)
American football offensive linemen
American football defensive linemen
Tennessee Tech Golden Eagles football players
Tampa Bay Storm players
Chicago Rush players